Hebdomochondra is a genus of moths of the family Noctuidae.

Species
 Hebdomochondra syrticola Staudinger, 1879

References
Natural History Museum Lepidoptera genus database
Hebdomochondra at funet

Heliothinae